Ioannis Athanasiadis (born 6 February 1947) is a Greek weightlifter. He competed in the men's flyweight event at the 1976 Summer Olympics.

References

External links
 

1947 births
Living people
Greek male weightlifters
Olympic weightlifters of Greece
Weightlifters at the 1976 Summer Olympics
Place of birth missing (living people)
20th-century Greek people